(Formerly ) is a Japanese company that manufactures LCD and DLP projectors, related accessories and overhead projectors.

History
Eiki was founded in 1953 in Osaka, Japan by four founders (M. Matsuura, S. Yagi, K. Sekino and Y. Minagawa). Initially the focus of the company was producing technology for classroom instruction but later on the company focused more on producing 16 mm movie projectors for other fields. The name Eiki comes from the Japanese term Eishaki meaning projector.

Eiki 16 mm projectors included only half of the moving parts of popular projectors, thus making them less costly and easier to maintain. They were  the largest manufacturer of such projectors.

In 1974, Eiki opened Eiki International, Inc., their USA division in Laguna Niguel, California to distribute its products in the United States. In 1986, the company acquired the business unit of the Bell & Howell company that had originated the audio visual industry some 50 years earlier. In 1988, Eiki Canada was created as a subsidiary of Eiki International, Inc. In 1995, Eiki Deutschland, GmbH became the company's first wholly owned office in Europe. And, in 1997 Eiki Czech was founded to establish a network of dealers across central and eastern Europe.

References

External links
 

Electronics companies established in 1953
Electronics companies of Japan
Display technology companies
Film and video technology
Japanese brands
1953 establishments in Japan
Companies based in Hyōgo Prefecture
Companies established in 1981